Shin'ichirō, Shin'ichiro, Shin'ichirou or Shin'ichiroh (written: 信一郎, 真一郎, 眞一郎, 晋一郎, 伸一郎, 振一郎 or 慎一郎) is a masculine Japanese given name. Notable people with the name include:

, Japanese politician
, Japanese composer
, Japanese professional shogi player
, Japanese baseball player
, Japanese anime director
, Japanese photographer
, Japanese baseball player
, Japanese anthropologist, philosopher, writer and politician
, Japanese diplomat
, Japanese footballer
, Japanese voice actor
, Japanese writer
, Japanese voice actor and announcer
, Japanese automotive engineer
, Japanese film director and screenwriter
, Japanese boxer
, Japanese footballer and manager
, Japanese footballer
, Japanese physicist
, Japanese anime director, screenwriter and producer

Japanese masculine given names